The 2000 UEFA European Football Championship, also known as Euro 2000, was the 11th UEFA European Championship, a football tournament held every four years and organised by UEFA, the sport's governing body in Europe.

The finals tournament was played between 10 June and 2 July 2000, and co-hosted by Belgium and the Netherlands, the first time the tournament had been held in more than one nation. Spain and Austria also bid to host the event. The finals tournament was contested by 16 nations; with the exception of the hosts, Belgium and the Netherlands, the finalists had to go through a qualifying tournament to reach the final stage. France won the tournament by defeating Italy 2–1 in the final, via a golden goal.

The finals saw the first major UEFA competition contested in the King Baudouin Stadium (formerly the Heysel Stadium) since the events of the 1985 European Cup Final and the Heysel Stadium disaster, with the opening game being played in the rebuilt stadium.

A high-scoring tournament with many exciting matches and a very high standard of play, Euro 2000 is often named by football writers as one of the greatest international tournaments ever.

Bid process
Belgium and the Netherlands were selected as co-hosts on 14 July 1995 by the UEFA Executive Committee at a meeting in Geneva, Switzerland.

Hooliganism concerns
Football hooliganism was a significant problem in the Netherlands in the 1990s, especially the fierce rivalry between Ajax and Feyenoord. There were concerns that hooliganism would overshadow the finals. Many instances of violence occurred, including several football riots in Rotterdam between 1995 and 1999, which would host the Euro 2000 final. One of the most infamous incidents was the Battle of Beverwijk in 1997. Although the violence is normally associated with domestic clubs, there were concerns that it could attach to the Dutch national team.

Violence did eventually occur during the Euro 2000 finals, albeit not involving the Dutch team. On 17 June 174 England fans were arrested in Brussels, Belgium, following violence with Germans ahead of an England v Germany match.

Summary
One of the biggest surprises of the tournament was Portugal, winning Group A with three wins, including a 3–0 win against Germany, with Sérgio Conceição scoring a hat-trick, and a 3–2 win over England, in which they came back from 2–0 down. Romania was the other qualifier from the group, beating England with a late penalty in their last group game.

Belgium had a surprise exit in the group stage, winning the tournament's first game against Sweden, but losing to Turkey and Italy. They finished third in Group B, behind Italy and Turkey. The other co-host and favourite, the Netherlands, progressed as expected from Group D, along with World Cup winners France. The Netherlands won the group, by beating France in their last group match. Also in Group D, Denmark's three losses with eight goals conceded and none scored set a new record for the worst team performance in the group stages of a Euros. Group C was memorable for the match between FR Yugoslavia and Spain. Spain needed a win to ensure progression, but found themselves trailing 3–2 after Slobodan Komljenović scored in the 75th minute. The Spanish side rescued their tournament by scoring twice in injury time to record a 4–3 victory. FR Yugoslavia managed to go through as well, despite losing because Norway and Slovenia played to a draw.

Italy and Portugal maintained their perfect records in the quarter-finals, beating Romania and Turkey, respectively, and the Netherlands started a goal-avalanche against FR Yugoslavia, winning 6–1. Spain fell 2–1 to France; Raúl missed a late penalty that ended Spanish hopes.

Italy eliminated the Netherlands in the semi-finals, despite going down to ten men and facing two penalty kicks. Italian goalkeeper Francesco Toldo, who had been drafted into the starting XI as Gianluigi Buffon missed the tournament through injury, made two saves in the penalty shootout (in addition to his penalty save in normal time) to carry the Italians to the final.

In the other semi-final, Portugal lost in extra time to France after Zinedine Zidane converted a controversial penalty kick. Several Portuguese players challenged the awarding of the penalty for a handball and were given lengthy suspensions for shoving the referee. France won the tournament, defeating Italy 2–1 in the final with a golden goal by David Trezeguet after equalising with a last-minute goal, and became the first team to win the European championship while being world champion.

In Britain, Match of the Day named Stefano Fiore's goal against Belgium the Goal of the Tournament, ahead of Patrick Kluivert's against France and Zinedine Zidane's against Spain.

Qualification

Qualification for the tournament took place throughout 1998 and 1999. Forty-nine teams were divided into nine groups and each played the others in their group, on a home-and-away basis. The winner of each group and the best runner-up qualified automatically for the final tournament. The eight other runners-up played an additional set of play-off matches to determine the last four qualifiers. Belgium and the Netherlands automatically qualified for the tournament as co-hosts.

As of 2020, this was the last time Serbia (then FR Yugoslavia) qualified for the European Championship finals, the only time that Norway and Slovenia qualified, as well as the last time that Croatia failed to qualify.

Qualified teams

Final draw
The finals draw took place 15:00 CET on 12 December 1999, at the Brussels Expo in Belgium; and was streamed live on UEFA's official website.

The composition of pots 1 to 4 was based on the teams' UEFA national team coefficient ranking at the end of 1999, with the exception of pot 1 automatically top seeding Germany as holders along with co-hosts Belgium and Netherlands. 

Prior to the draw, the seeded teams in Pot 1 were assigned positions: Germany (defending champion) to A1, Belgium (co-host) to B1, Spain (highest coefficient) to C1, and the Netherlands (co-host) to D1. Teams were drawn consecutively from Pots 2 to 4 into a group, with each team then being assigned a specific position (for the purposes of determining the match schedules in each group).

The draw resulted in the following groups:

Venues
Capacity figures are those for matches at UEFA Euro 2000 and are not necessarily the total capacity that the stadium is capable of holding.

Team base camps
The 16 national teams each stayed in their own "team base camp" during the tournament.

Squads

Each national team had to submit a squad of 22 players, three of whom must be goalkeepers.

Match officials
On 15 February 2000, UEFA appointed 12 referees, 16 assistant referees and four fourth officials for the competition, including a referee and an assistant referee from the Confederation of African Football. The event saw assistant referees being allowed to intervene an ongoing game, in particular to help the match official apply the 10-metre rule when deciding free-kicks – as well as warn the referee instantly if he had booked or ejected the wrong player, something that was not possible in previous tournaments. Also, fourth officials were given a larger role in assisting to take command of the match if any decisions are gone unnoticed by the referee or an assistant referee.
 
The German referee Markus Merk was selected to referee the opening game between Belgium and Sweden.

Group stage

The teams finishing in the top two positions in each of the four groups progress to the quarter-finals, while the bottom two teams in each group were eliminated.

All times are local, CEST (UTC+2).

Tiebreakers
If two or more teams finished level on points after completion of the group matches, the following tie-breakers were used to determine the final ranking:

 greater number of points in the matches between the teams in question;
 greater goal difference in matches between the teams in question;
 greater number of goals scored in matches between the teams in question;
 greater goal difference in all group games;
 greater number of goals scored in all group games;
 higher coefficient derived from Euro 2000 and 1998 World Cup qualifiers (points obtained divided by number of matches played);
 fair play conduct in Euro 2000;
 drawing of lots.

Group A

Group B

Group C

Group D

Knockout stage

The knockout stage was a single-elimination tournament with each round eliminating the losers. Any game that was undecided by the end of the regular 90 minutes, was followed by up to thirty minutes of extra time. For the second time the golden goal system was applied, whereby the first team to score during the extra time would become the winner. If no goal was scored there would be a penalty shoot-out to determine the winner. For the second time the final was won by a golden goal.

As with every tournament since UEFA Euro 1984, there was no third place play-off.

All times are local, CEST (UTC+2).

Bracket

Quarter-finals

Semi-finals

Final

Statistics

Goalscorers

Awards
UEFA Team of the Tournament

Golden Boot
 Patrick Kluivert (5 goals)
 Savo Milošević (5 goals)

UEFA Player of the Tournament
 Zinedine Zidane

Prize money

A sum of CHF120 million was awarded to the 16 qualified teams in the competition. France, the winners of the tournament, received a total prize money of CHF14.4 million. Below is a complete list of the allocations:

Extra payment based on teams performances:
Winner: CHF14.4 million
Runner-up: CHF13.2 million
Semi-finals: CHF10.2 million
Quarter-finals: CHF7.8 million
Group stage: 
Third place: CHF5.4 million
Fourth place: CHF4.8 million

On 9 July 2000, UEFA refused to hand FR Yugoslavia their prize money of CHF7.8 million, because of alleged ties between the Football Association of FR Yugoslavia and Slobodan Milošević's government. However, no connections were found and the Football Association of FR Yugoslavia later received their money with an additional bonus.

Marketing

Slogan and theme song

The slogan of the competition was "Football without frontiers". "Campione 2000" by E-Type was the official anthem of the event.

Match ball

The Adidas Terrestra Silverstream was unveiled as the official match ball of the competition on 13 December 1999 at Constant Vanden Stock Stadium, Anderlecht's home arena by Alessandro Del Piero, Edwin van der Sar, Zinedine Zidane and Luc Nilis.

Mascot

The official mascot for the tournament was Benelucky (a pun on Benelux), a lion-devil hybrid with its mane having the flag colours of both host nations. The lion is the national football emblem of the Netherlands and a devil is the emblem of Belgium (the team being nicknamed "the Red Devils").

Sponsorship
UEFA distinguishes between global sponsors and national sponsors. Global Euro sponsors can come from any country and have exclusive worldwide sponsorship rights for a UEFA Euro championship. National (event) sponsors come from a host country and only have sponsorship rights within that country.

Broadcasting

Notes

References

External links

 UEFA Euro 2000 at UEFA.com
 

 
2000
1999–2000 in European football
1999–2000 in Belgian football
1999–2000 in Dutch football
2000
2000
Belgium–Netherlands relations
June 2000 sports events in Europe
July 2000 sports events in Europe